Cerithiopsis bakeri is a species of very small sea snails, marine gastropod molluscs in the family Cerithiopsidae. It was described by Bartsch in 1917. Cerithiopsis bakeri has been found near the Gulf of Mexico and California.

References

bakeri
Gastropods described in 1917